1-(5-phosphoribosyl)-5-((5-phosphoribosylamino)methylideneamino)imidazole-4-carboxamide isomerase (N-(5-phospho-D-ribosylformimino)-5-amino-1-(5-phosphoribosyl)-4-imidazolecarboxamide isomerase, phosphoribosylformiminoaminophosphoribosylimidazolecarboxamide isomerase, N-(phosphoribosylformimino) aminophosphoribosylimidazolecarboxamide isomerase, 1-(5-phosphoribosyl)-5-[(5-phosphoribosylamino)methylideneamino]imidazole-4-carboxamide ketol-isomerase) is an enzyme with systematic name 1-(5-phosphoribosyl)-5-((5-phosphoribosylamino)methylideneamino)imidazole-4-carboxamide aldose-ketose-isomerase. This enzyme catalyses the following chemical reaction

 1-(5-phosphoribosyl)-5-[(5-phosphoribosylamino)methylideneamino]imidazole-4-carboxamide  5-[(5-phospho-1-deoxyribulos-1-ylamino)methylideneamino]-1-(5-phosphoribosyl)imidazole-4-carboxamide

References

External links 
 

EC 5.3.1